Jesús David Marimón Báez (9 September 1998) is a footballer from Colombia who plays as a defensive midfielder who plays for Colombian side Deportes Quindío.

Club career
Marimón made his league debut at 17 August 2015 against Jaguares de Córdoba.

References

1998 births
Living people
Colombian footballers
Colombian expatriate footballers
Association football midfielders
Once Caldas footballers
Royal Excel Mouscron players
Patriotas Boyacá footballers
Deportes Quindío footballers
Categoría Primera A players
Belgian Pro League players
Colombian expatriate sportspeople in Belgium
Expatriate footballers in Belgium
People from Bolívar Department